Something Burning is the sixth album by heavy metal band Vicious Rumors, released in 1996.

Track listing
"Ballhog" - 3:38
"Mouth" - 3:11
"Out of My Misery" - 4:00
"Something Burning" - 3:41
"Concentration" - 4:07
"Chopping Block" - 4:10
"Perpetual" - 3:54
"Strip Search" - 3:35
"Make It Real" - 4:45
"Free to Go" - 4:59

Personnel
 Geoff Thorpe: Guitars, Vocals
 Steve Smyth: Guitars
 Tommy Sisco: Bass
 Larry Howe: Drums

References

1996 albums
Vicious Rumors albums